Barefoot also barefooted, the state of not wearing any footwear.

Barefoot may also refer to:

In sports
 Barefoot running, running while barefoot—without wearing any shoes on the feet
 Barefoot skiing, water skiing behind a motorboat without the use of water skis, commonly referred to as "barefooting"
 Barefoot (horse) (1820–1840), a British thoroughbred racehorse
 Barefoot horses, horses which are kept barefoot full-time, as opposed to horses who are fitted with horse shoes: see Natural hoof care

In media and entertainment
 Barefoot (2005 film), a German romantic comedy film
 Barefoot (2014 film), an American romantic comedy-drama film
 Barefoot (2017 film), a Czech film
 Barefoot, a musical duo made up of TommyD and Sam Obernik

 Barefoot, an album by Ninet Tayeb
 Barefoot (miniseries), a 2011 Israeli television miniseries

Other uses
 Barefoot (name)
 Barefoot Catalogue, series of stamp catalogues published in England by John Barefoot
 Barefoot, Kentucky, a community in the United States
 Barefoot (retailer), a chain of retail stores in Sri Lanka
 Of a truck/lorry in snowy and icy conditions, "without tyre chains"

See also
 Barefoot and pregnant, a figure of speech
 Barefoot Augustinians, a religious order
 Barefoot Books, an independent children's book publisher based in Bath, UK and Cambridge, Massachusetts, USA
 Barefoot doctors, farmers who received minimal basic medical and paramedical training and worked in rural villages in the People's Republic of China
 Barefoot sandals, a form of footwear
 Barfoot, a surname